Valeria Răcilă (later Roşca, later van Groningen, born 2 June 1957) is a retired Romanian rower. She first competed in double and quadruple sculls, winning bronze medals at the 1980 Olympics and 1979 and 1981 world championships. She then changed to single sculls, and won an Olympic gold medal in 1984 and silver medals at the world championships in 1982 and 1985.

References

1957 births
Living people
Romanian female rowers
Olympic rowers of Romania
Olympic gold medalists for Romania
Olympic bronze medalists for Romania
Rowers at the 1980 Summer Olympics
Rowers at the 1984 Summer Olympics
Olympic medalists in rowing
World Rowing Championships medalists for Romania
Medalists at the 1984 Summer Olympics
Medalists at the 1980 Summer Olympics